Jules Szymkowiak (born 1 October 1995 in Heerlen, Limburg) is a Dutch racing driver. After competing in the FIA Formula 3 European Championship he transferred to GT-racing in various GT3 championships.

Career

Single seaters

After karting in various Rotax Max powered classes Szymkowiak was selected to compete in the Formula BMW Talent Cup in 2013. The Dutch driver won four races during the season, two at the Red Bull Ring and two at the Slovakia Ring. At the championship Grand Final at Motorsport Arena Oschersleben Szymkowiak finished second in the first race, retired in the second race and placed sixth in the third race. The Dutchman had to settle for sixth in the overall standings.

For 2014 Szymkowiak was announced to race with Van Amersfoort Racing in the FIA Formula 3 European Championship. Former Formula One driver Adrian Sutil advised on Szymkowiak transitioning into Formula 3. At the Hungaroring Szymkowiak scored his best result placing sixth. During the season the driver scored seventeen points placing twentieth in the series.

GT racing

Szymkowiak made his GT3 racing debut with HTP Motorsport in a Bentley Continental GT. The rookie landed his HTP racing seat by filling in an application form. In the 2015 Blancpain Sprint Series the Dutch driver shared his car with three different drivers during the season, Olivier Lombard, Tom Dillmann and Max van Splunteren. In the overall classification Szymkowiak scored a couple of sixth places as his best result. As a silver graded driver he qualified for the Silver Cup. In the Silver Cup he scored nine class victories out of thirteen races dominating the championship. To qualify to race GT3 machinery in the VLN and the 24 Hours of Nürburgring Szymkowiak needed a DMSB Permit Nordschleife Grade A. To receive the permit Szymkowiak raced in the 2015 DMV Münsterlandpokal entered on two cars, one BMW M235i and one Honda Civic Type-R. With HTP Motorsport switching to the new Mercedes-AMG GT Szymkowiak got a new teammate for the Blancpain GT Sprint Series, Bernd Schneider. The duo won their first race at Brands Hatch. The duo scored another two podium finishes placing them fourth in the series championship. As a rising talent he won the Sean Edwards Trophy, over other finalists Dries Vanthoor and Luca Stoltz. For 2017 Szymkowiak partnered with Fabian Schiller again qualifying to compete in the Silver Cup classification. The duo scored a second place overall finish at the season opener at Misano. They also won the Silver Cup classification seven times, again winning the championship.

Racing record

Complete FIA European Formula 3 Championship results
(key)

Complete Blancpain GT Series Sprint Cup results

Complete Blancpain Endurance Series results

References

1995 births
Living people
Formula BMW drivers
Blancpain Endurance Series drivers
FIA Formula 3 European Championship drivers
Sportspeople from Heerlen
Dutch racing drivers
Van Amersfoort Racing drivers
Nürburgring 24 Hours drivers
Dutch people of Polish descent
GT4 European Series drivers